Yury Rybak (born 6 March 1979) is a Belarusian judoka and sambist.

Achievements

References

External links
 
 

1979 births
Living people
Belarusian male judoka
Belarusian sambo practitioners
Judoka at the 2004 Summer Olympics
Judoka at the 2008 Summer Olympics
Olympic judoka of Belarus
Sambo practitioners at the 2015 European Games
European Games medalists in sambo
European Games bronze medalists for Belarus
Sambo practitioners at the 2019 European Games